Bridelia speciosa is a tree in the family Phyllanthaceae native to tropical western Africa (Burkina Faso, Ghana, Ivory Coast, Nigeria, Cameroon).

References

External links
 

speciosa
Flora of West Tropical Africa
Flora of Cameroon
Plants described in 1864